Thomas Christopher Henry (born November 8, 1951) is an American businessman and politician who is the 35th Mayor of Fort Wayne, Indiana. A member of the Democratic Party, Henry served five terms on Fort Wayne City Council from 1984 to 2004, representing the 3rd District. Henry is president and CEO of the Gallant Group, an insurance agency specializing in healthcare consulting.

Early life
Tom Henry was the second of 17 children born to Jerome and Marganelle "Marge" Henry.

He attended Fort Wayne Central Catholic High School, graduating in 1970. He served in the United States Army Military Police Corps from 1971 to 1973. He then received a bachelor's degree in psychology and an MBA, both from the University of Saint Francis.

City Council
Henry represented the Third District for five terms on the Fort Wayne City Council between 1984 and 2004. He was preceded by the Republican Roy Schomburg. Henry won re-election in 1995 by only five votes after the outcome was determined by a recount. He lost a bid for a sixth term in 2003.

Mayoral campaigns
Henry announced his bid for the Democratic nomination for mayor on February 21, 2007. He had considered running for mayor in 1999, but backed out and supported the Democratic challenger who went on to become mayor, Graham Richard.

Henry won the Democratic mayoral primary on May 8, 2007, with 82.4 percent of the vote against token opposition. He defeated the Republican Matt Kelty in the November election, with 60 percent of the vote.

Henry was reelected on November 8, 2011, with 49.9 percent of votes against the Republican challenger Paula Hughes' 46 percent.

Henry defeated Republican challenger Mitch Harper on November 3, 2015, the first Democrat in Fort Wayne's history to win three consecutive mayoral terms. Henry won with 57% of the vote, receiving  23,769 votes to Harper's 18,067.

On November 5, 2019 Tom Henry won the 2019 mayoral election, defeating Republican businessman, Tim Smith of MedPro Group. According to unofficial results from the Allen County Election Board on November 5, 2019, Henry won with 61.21% of the vote while Smith came away with 38.29%. Henry won his fourth term as Mayor of Fort Wayne, Indiana and said his fourth term would be his last.

Mayoralty
On December 15, 2008, Henry signed the revised noise ordinance passed by city council, making light pollution a violation of city ordinance. "Although I have concerns about this ordinance, it is up to council to decide what legislative action is appropriate for our community," Henry said in a written statement.

On December 9, Fort Wayne City Council voted 5–4 to pass a revised noise ordinance to include a section pertaining to improper use of directional lighting. Floodlights, bullet lights and spotlights must be focused away from a neighbor's home, or Fort Wayne Police can cite the offender if a complaint is made. Security lights are permissible.

The amendment was introduced at the August 12 meeting by John Shoaff, D-at large, to end a dispute between two of his constituents, one of whom had allegedly been shining a directional light into the other's home. Henry said council should still work to hone the amendment so it can be enforced when necessary. " …This ordinance will be difficult to enforce as written and … certain exceptions to its provisions should be considered," Henry said in a statement. "Amongst the concerns raised were athletic events held in the evening, holiday light displays and emergency repair work, to name a few."

Henry is the second longest serving Mayor of Fort Wayne. Only Harry Baals was mayor for longer. After winning his fourth term in November 2019, Henry announced it would be his last term as mayor, though he later decided to run for a fifth term against businessman and 3rd District City Council Republican Tom Didier. Henry was sworn in for his fourth term on January 1, 2020. His fourth term will expire on January 1, 2024.

Personal life
Henry married Cindy Kocks in 1975. They have two children and, as of 2009, two grandchildren. Henry and his family are Catholics and members of the Most Precious Blood Catholic Church.

Henry was involved in a motor vehicle accident on October 8th, 2022 in which he was attempting to exit a roundabout too quickly and sideswiped another motorist. At the time of the accident, he was driving a 2019 Chevrolet Impala, which is owned by the City of Fort Wayne. Subsequently, he was arrested for OWI on October 9, 2022, and pleaded guilty, resulting in him having his license suspended for 90 days and not being allowed to drink or own alcohol for a year. Henry had a blood alcohol content of 0.152% at the time of the investigation, resulting in a second charge of BAC over .15% which was dropped in the plea deal.

References

External links

 Mayor signs "light pollution" revision

Mayors of Fort Wayne, Indiana
Indiana Democrats
American Roman Catholics
University of Saint Francis (Indiana) alumni
1951 births
Living people
21st-century American politicians
People from Fort Wayne, Indiana